The 2014 season is BK Häcken's 74th in existence and their 14th season in Allsvenskan. They competed in Allsvenskan and 2013–14 Svenska Cupen.

Competitions

Allsvenskan

League table

Matches

2013–14 Svenska Cupen

References

BK Häcken seasons
BK Hacken